Elisabeth Schicho (born 10 May 1991) is a German former cross-country skier. She competed in the women's sprint at the 2018 Winter Olympics. She announced her retirement from cross-country skiing in March 2019.

Cross-country skiing results
All results are sourced from the International Ski Federation (FIS).

Olympic Games

World Cup

Season standings

References

External links
 

1991 births
Living people
German female cross-country skiers
Olympic cross-country skiers of Germany
Cross-country skiers at the 2018 Winter Olympics
Place of birth missing (living people)
Sportspeople from Upper Bavaria
People from Miesbach (district)